The 2019 Arkansas–Pine Bluff Golden Lions football team represents the University of Arkansas at Pine Bluff in the 2019 NCAA Division I FCS football season. The Golden Lions are led by second-year head coach Cedric Thomas and play their home games at Simmons Bank Field in Pine Bluff, Arkansas as members of the West Division of the Southwestern Athletic Conference (SWAC).

Previous season
The Golden Lions finished the 2018 season 2–9, 1–6 in SWAC play to finish in a tie for last place in the West Division.

Preseason

Preseason polls
The SWAC released their preseason poll on July 16, 2019. The Golden Lions were picked to finish in fifth place in the West Division.

Preseason all–SWAC teams
The Golden Lions placed four players on the preseason all–SWAC teams.

Offense

1st team

Taeyler Porter – RB

DeJuan Miller – WR

Defense

1st team

Jalen Steward – DL

Specialists

2nd team

Tyrin Ralph – RS

Schedule

Game summaries

at TCU

at Alabama A&M

Langston

at Tennessee State

Southern

Lane

Mississippi Valley State

Grambling State

at Jackson State

at Prairie View A&M

Texas Southern

References

Arkansas-Pine Bluff
Arkansas–Pine Bluff Golden Lions football seasons
Arkansas-Pine Bluff Golden Lions f